The 1951 Rice Owls football team represented Rice University during the 1951 college football season. The Owls were led by 12th-year head coach Jess Neely and played their home games at  Rice Stadium in Houston, Texas. The team competed as members of the Southwest Conference, finishing tied for third.

Schedule

References

Rice
Rice Owls football seasons
Rice Owls football